Alien Hominid is an independently developed run and gun video game developed by The Behemoth. The game was developed from an Adobe Flash game originally released on Newgrounds in August 2002. O3 Entertainment released the game for PlayStation 2 and GameCube in North America in 2004, whilst ZOO Digital Publishing released the game in Europe for PlayStation 2, Xbox, mobile phones and Gizmondo in 2005. A port for the Game Boy Advance, co-developed by Tuna Technologies, was also released in Europe in 2006. A high-definition version titled Alien Hominid HD was released for Xbox 360 via the Xbox Live Arcade service on February 28, 2007. A re-imagination, Alien Hominid Invasion, is in development for Windows, Nintendo Switch, and Xbox One.

Gameplay
Alien Hominid is a side-scrolling shooter in a similar vein to games such as Metal Slug, where one hit instantly kills and has a two-player simultaneous play. Players take over as the titular hominid, who has to fend off waves of secret agents. His main arsenal is a blaster, while players can also melee close-up enemies and use a limited number of grenades to attack. Advanced moves include rolling under shots, jumping on and biting off enemies' heads, temporarily scaring other enemies, and digging underground to drag enemies down with them.

Players can collect a numerous variety of power-ups which simultaneously give players extra grenades, a shield, and unique ammo. Players can also drive vehicles, ride on top of a Yeti, and pilot a UFO. Completing certain tasks will unlock hats the players can dress their Hominid in. The main game features sixteen stages.

Outside of the main game, there are three multiplayer modes (Challenge, Neutron Ball, and Pinata Boss), a PDA game (featuring around 200 levels and a level editor), an extra mode called All You Can Eat, and a retro minigame, Super Soviet Missile Mastar.

Development
Alien Hominid began as a Flash game developed by programmer Tom Fulp and animator Dan Paladin, which was released on Newgrounds in August 2002. It is often referred to as the Alien Hominid "prototype" by The Behemoth. The game consisted of one level containing two bosses, who would later reappear in the retail version. It became very popular among the online gaming site and has been played over 20 million times. Later in the year, then-co-worker John Baez approached Paladin as a fan of Alien Hominid. He suggested that Paladin and Fulp make a console version of the game, even offering to produce the game. Both Paladin and Fulp agreed with his idea, forming The Behemoth.

In the course of two years, Alien Hominid became a much larger project than its online prototype. While 3D graphics were considered initially, The Behemoth decided nothing compared to the traditional 2D stylings of the prototype. The project was entirely re-coded for consoles, and many new gameplay features were created. Matt Harwood created the music for the game.

Legacy
Hominid appears during one of the levels in The Behemoth's 2nd game, Castle Crashers, using a lance weapon based on his ray gun. He is playable to anyone who has also downloaded Alien Hominid HD on the Xbox 360 version, while he is unlocked by completing said level on the PlayStation Network and Steam versions of the game. The green eyeball from an early boss fight also appears as an Animal Orb, firing lasers at enemies. Hominid appears as a playable character in Team Meat's Super Meat Boy, another game that originated as a flash game on Newgrounds. The Super Soviet Missile Mastar minigame from Alien Hominid was released as a free app for iOS on February 7, 2011. An improved version of the PDA Games minigame was released for iOS on December 9, 2011. Developer Tom Fulp has cited the PDA Games as being the inspiration for The Behemoth's third game, BattleBlock Theater, which features unlockable Hominid character heads for those who own Alien Hominid HD.

On January 30, 2020, Behemoth announced their fifth game, Alien Hominid Invasion, which they describe as "an all-new re-imagination" of the original game featuring new gameplay and mechanics. The game is in development for Xbox One, Nintendo Switch, and PC. It is planned to release in 2023.

Reception

The game received "generally favorable reviews" on all platforms except the Game Boy Advance version, which received universal acclaim, according to the review aggregation website Metacritic. It was nominated for GameSpots annual "Funniest Game" award, which went to Grand Theft Auto: San Andreas.

Before its release, Alien Hominid received notice in gaming magazines such as Play, GMR, Edge, Dragon, and mainstream magazines such as Wired. In reviews for the game, it was critically acclaimed for its old-school style gameplay, tough level of difficulty, and quirky humor. The game also won many small awards, most notably at the Independent Games Festival (for Innovation In Visual Arts, Technical Excellence and the Audience Award).

References

External links
Official U.S. website
Original Flash prototype
Developer The Behemoth
Tuna Technologies (Game Boy Advance conversion)

2002 video games
Flash games ported to consoles
Game Boy Advance games
GameCube games
Gizmondo games
Independent Games Festival winners
Indie video games
IOS games
Mobile games
Multiplayer and single-player video games
PlayStation 2 games
Run and gun games
Side-scrolling video games
The Behemoth games
Video games about extraterrestrial life
Video games developed in the United Kingdom
Video games developed in the United States
Video games scored by Allister Brimble
Video games set in Russia
Video games set in Nevada
Xbox games
Xbox 360 Live Arcade games